Paltiel  may refer to one of the following:
Palti, son of Laish
Chaim Paltiel (Paltiel of Falaise)
Julius Paltiel